This is an annotated list of important business writers. It is in alphabetical order based on last name. For quick navigation, click on one of the letters:

A
 David Aaker (born 1938) - marketing, brand strategy
 Wil van der Aalst
 James Abegglen (1926–2007) - management and business in Japan
 Bodo Abel
 Russell L. Ackoff (1919–2009) - operations research, organizational theory
 John Adair (born 1934) - leadership
 Karol Adamiecki (1866–1933) - management
 Ichak Adizes
 Niclas Adler (born 1971) - Swedish organizational theorist
 Charles Constance César Joseph Matthieu d'Agoult
 Yoji Akao
 Ali Akdemir
 Mark Albion (born 1951) - values-based business
 Howard E. Aldrich (born 1940s) - American sociologist and organizational theorist
 Leon P. Alford (1877–1942) - scientific management
 Tim Ambler (born 1938) - marketing effectiveness
 Igor Ansoff (1918–2002) - strategic management
 Ingeman Arbnor
 Chris Argyris (1923–2013) - learning systems, learning organization
 Horace Lucian Arnold (1837–1915)
 Neal Ashkanasy

B
 Stephen R. Barley (born 1953) - technology, organizational change, organizational culture
 Chester Barnard (1886–1961) - management
 Gary S. Becker
 Charles Bedaux (1886–1944) - scientific management
 Warren Bennis (1925–2014) - leadership studies
 Per Olof Berg (born 1946) - Swedish organizational theorist
 Manfred Berliner
 Björn Bjerke
 Patrick Blackett, Baron Blackett (1897–1974) - operations research
 Ken Blanchard
 Charles Bosanquet
 Matthew Boulton (1728–1809) - labor productivity
 Marvin Bower
 Richard Boyatzis (born 1946) - emotional intelligence, behavior change, and competence
 Leland Lawrence Briggs (1893–1975) - American accounting scholar
 John Seely Brown
 Wilfred Brown, Baron Brown
 Nils Brunsson (born 1946) - institutionalized hypocrisy of organizations
 Lawton Burns (born c. 1950) - health care systems

C
 Noel Capon
 Charles U. Carpenter 
 Jean-Luc Cerdin
 James A. Champy - business process reengineering (1990s)
 Alfred D. Chandler, Jr. - management, Pulitzer prize for The Visible Hand: The Managerial Revolution in American Business (1977)
 Clayton M. Christensen
 Alexander Hamilton Church - industrial management (1900s–1910s)
 C. West Churchman
 Stewart Clegg
 Ronald Coase - transaction costs, Coase theorem, theory of the firm (1950s) (Nobel Prize in 1991)
 James C. Collins - vision statement, strategic planning and BHAG (1990s)
 Morris Llewellyn Cooke
 Cary Cooper
 Stephen Covey
 Philip B. Crosby
 Richard Cyert
 Barbara Czarniawska

D
 Robert Dahlstrom (born 1958) - American organizational theorist, works on international marketing
 David Dale
 Thomas H. Davenport
 George S. Day - marketing (1970s)
 Jeff DeGraff
 Morris H. DeGroot
 W. Edwards Deming - statistical quality control (1950s, 1960s)
 Daniel R. Denison
 Eric Dent
 Hugo Diemer - industrial engineering (1910s)
 Jan Dietz
 Patrick Dixon
 Henk van Dongen
 Sytse Douma
 Wiebe Draijer
 Peter Drucker (1909–2005) - management (1950s, 1960s, 1970s, 1980s) 
 Anna Dubois (born 1962) - Swedish organizational theorist
 Peter Dunn

E
 Andrew S.C. Ehrenberg
 Michael Eisner
 Chester Elton
 Tunç Erem
 Richard F. Ericson
 Hans-Erik Eriksson (born 1961) - Swedish computer scientist and organizational theorist
 Agner Krarup Erlang
 Hamid Etemad

F
 Henri Fayol - management (1910s)
 Armand V. Feigenbaum - quality control (1950s)
 Tim Ferriss
 Harry Anson Finney (1886–1966) - American accountancy author
 Ronald Fisher - statistics (1920s)
 Mary Follett - organizational studies (1930s)
 Nicolai J. Foss
 R. Edward Freeman
 Mike L. Fry
 Adrian Furnham

G
 John Kenneth Galbraith - The New Industrial State (1967)
 Henry Gantt - Gantt chart (20th century)
 Burleigh B. Gardner (1902–1985) - motivation research
 Michael Gerber - E-Myth Revisited
 Jamshid Gharajedaghi (born 1940) - American organizational theorist, management consultant, and Adjunct Professor of Systems Thinking
 Sumantra Ghoshal
 John P. van Gigch
 Frank Bunker Gilbreth, Sr.
 Frank Gilbreth - time and motion study (20th century)
 Seth Godin
 Eliyahu M. Goldratt - theory of constraints (1980s)
 Marshall Goldsmith
 Daniel Goleman
 Vytautas Andrius Graiciunas - management (1933)
 Lynda Gratton
 C. Jackson Grayson
 Danny Greefhorst (born 1972) - Dutch enterprise architect
 Miriam Green
 James Bray Griffith (1871–1937) - American business theorist 
 William H. Gruber (born 1935) - American organizational theorist
 Erich Gutenberg - theory of the firm (1950s)

H
 Stephan H. Haeckel
 Stephen G. Haines
 Noel Frederick Hall
 Brian Halligan
 Gary Hamel (born 1954) - core competency, strategic management (1990s)
 Michael Hammer - business process reengineering (1990s)
 Charles Handy - organisational behaviour (1990s)
 Paul Harmon - management author
 G. Charter Harrison (1881–1959) - Anglo-American management consultant and cost account pioneer
 Sven A. Haugland (born 1948) - Norwegian organizational theorist 
 David L. Hawk
 Igor Hawryszkiewycz (born 1948) - American computer scientist and organizational theorist
 Robert Heller
 Frederick Herzberg - two factor theory, motivation theory, job enrichment (1970s)
 Steen Hildebrandt
 Charles DeLano Hine 
 Geert Hofstede
 Kenneth Hopper
 Yasheng Huang
 Albert S Humphrey - strategic planning, SWOT analysis (1970s, 1980s)
 Shelby D. Hunt
 Walter Hunziker

I
 Masaaki Imai (born 1930) - Kaizen (continuous improvement) (1980s, 1990s, 2000s)
 Anders Indset (born 1978)
 Kaoru Ishikawa (1915–1989) - Ishikawa diagram in industrial process; quality circles (1960s)

J
 Mike Jackson - systems scientist
 Lars Jaeger
 John Jantsch
 Dave Jenks
 Anita Jose
 Joseph M. Juran (1904–2008) - quality control, especially quality circles (1960s, 1970s)

K
 Rosabeth Moss Kanter - business management and change management (1977)
 Robert S. Kaplan - management accounting and balanced scorecard (1990s)
 Dexter Keezer
 Kevin Lane Keller
 Roy B. Kester (1882–1965) - American accountancy scholar
 Tarun Khanna
 Walter Kickert (born 1950) - Dutch academic and Professor of Public Management
 John Warren Kindt
 Charles Edward Knoeppel
 Richard Koch
 Lars Kolind
 Monika Kostera
 Philip Kotler - marketing management and social marketing (1970s, 1980s, 1990s)
 John Kotter - organizational behaviour and management (1980s, 1990s)
 Joe Kutchera (born 1970), American author, columnist and marketing executive
 Vladimir Kvint - strategy

L
 John Christian Langli
 Jean-Claude Larréché
 Kyoung Jun Lee
 William Henry Leffingwell - office management (1910s–1940s)
 Paul Leonardi
 Harry Levinson
 Theodore Levitt - marketing and globalization (1960s, 1970s)
 Michael Lewis
 Peter Lindgren (born 1961) - Danish organizational theorist 
 John Lintner - capital asset pricing model (1970s)
 Ted London
 Juan Antonio Pérez López
 Jay Lorsch
 Michael Lounsbury
 Randi Lunnan (born 1963) - Norwegian organizational theorist, works on strategic alliances
 Reijo Luostarinen (1939–2017) - Finnish organisational theorist
 James Alexander Lyons (1861–1920) - American accountancy author

M

 John Van Maanen
 James MacGregor Burns
 Kenneth D. Mackenzie
 Teemu Malmi (born 1965) - Finnish organizational theorist 
 Vincent Mangematin
 James G. March - theory of the firm (1960s)
 Constantinos Markides - strategic management and strategy dynamics (1990s)
 Harry Markowitz - modern portfolio theory (1960s, 1970s), Nobel Prize in 1990
 Perry Marshall
 John C. Maxwell - leadership (1990s, 2000s, 2010s)
 Elton Mayo - job satisfaction and Hawthorne effect (1920s, 1930s)
 John H. McArthur
 Daniel McCallum - organizational charts (1850s)
 Douglas McGregor
 Dalton McGuinty, Sr.
 Geoff Meeks (born 1949) - British accounting scholar
 Lucas Meijs
 Leo Melamed - currency futures and derivatives (1980s, 1990s)
 Gary Metcalf
 Henry C. Metcalf - the science of administration (1920s)
 Henry Metcalfe - the science of administration (1880s)
 Gerald Midgley
 Danny Miller - economist
 Merton Miller - Modigliani–Miller theorem and corporate finance (1970s)
 Henry Mintzberg (born 1939) - organizational architecture, strategic management (1970s–2000s) 
 Franco Modigliani - Modigliani–Miller theorem and corporate finance (1970s)
 Geoffrey Moore
 Richard Moran
 Gareth Morgan
 Gerry Morgan
 Silvina Moschini
 Hugo Münsterberg - psychology of work (1910s)
 J. Keith Murnighan
 Christa Muth

N
 Peter Naudé - marketing and business networks
 Nicholas Negroponte - human-computer interaction (1970s–1990s)
 Nobuo Noda - Japanese business scholar
 Kjell A. Nordström
 Arne Nygaard (born 1957) - Norwegian organizational theorist

O
 George S. Odiorne - management by objectives
 Kenichi Ohmae - 3C's model and strategic management (1970s, 1980s)
 Taiichi Ohno - Toyota Production System, lean manufacturing, just in time (1980s)
 David Ogilvy - advertising (1960s–1980s)
 Sharon Oster
 William Ouchi - Theory Z (1980s)
 Robert Owen - cooperatives (1810s)

P

 Luca Pacioli - double-entry bookkeeping system and financial statements (1494)
 Javier Perez-Capdevila - strategic management and business analysis and valuation
 Krishna Palepu - business analysis and valuation, financial statements
 Scott Patterson
 Keith Pavitt - innovation clusters and innovation taxonomy (1970s through 2000)
 Edith Penrose - The Theory of the Growth of the Firm (1959)
 Juan Antonio Pérez López - negative learning (1990s)
 Oscar E. Perrigo - shop management (1900s)
 Laurence J. Peter - Peter Principle (1970s)
 Thomas J. Peters - management (1970s, 1980s)
 Jeffrey Pfeffer - organizational development (1970s–?)
 Robert Allen Phillips
 Rebecca Piekkari (born 1967) - Finnish organizational theorist 
 Henry Varnum Poor - principles of organization (1850s–?)
 Michael Porter - strategic management and Porter's 5 forces (1970s–1990s)
 C. K. Prahalad (1941–2010) - core competency (1980s)
 Derek S. Pugh

R
 J. Donald R. de Raadt
 Navi Radjou
 N. Ravichandaran
 Jeffrey Rayport
 W. Charles Redding
 Robert Reich
 Fred Reichheld
 Reg Revans
 Jeremy Rifkin
 Fritz Roethlisberger
 Georges Romme
 Mike Rother

S

 Martti Saario (1906–1988) - Finnish organizational theorist and Professor of Accounting
 Kenan Sahin
 Mohammad Ali Sarlak
 Jason Saul
 August-Wilhelm Scheer
 Edgar Schein
 Eugen Schmalenbach - economic value added (1920s–?)
 Hein Schreuder
 David Meerman Scott (born 1961) - inbound marketing and PR in the Internet era (2008-)
 Walter Dill Scott - psychology of personnel management (1920s)
 Esbjörn Segelod (born 1951) - Swedish organizational theorist
 Peter Senge
 Dorian Shainin
 Stanley J. Shapiro
 Seena Sharp
 Oliver Sheldon - business philosophy (1920s)
 Walter A. Shewhart - control charts (1920s–1930s)
 Shigeo Shingo (1909–1990) - Zero Quality Control (Poka-Yoke) and Single Minute Exchange of Dies (SMED)
 Herbert A. Simon (1916–2001) - satisficing Nobel Prize, 1978
 Ibrahim Sirkeci
 Adrian Slywotzky - marketing strategy (1990s)
 Linda Smircich
 Adam Smith - economics, capitalism, free trade (1770s)
 Ivan Snehota (1946–2022) - Czechoslovakian-born Italian organizational theorist
 Henk G. Sol
 Rolf Solli
 Thomas J. Stanley
 Andy Stefanovich
 Victor Hermann Stempf (1893–1946) - American accountant
 Joel Stern - economic value added (1980s)
 Rosemary Stewart - business theorist
 Antonio Strati
 Robert I. Sutton
 G. A. Swanson
 Richard A. Swanson
 William R. Synnott

T
 Genichi Taguchi (1924–2012) - Taguchi methods, quality control
 Don Tapscott
 Frederick Winslow Taylor - scientific management, time and motion study (20th century)
 Sridhar Tayur
 David Teece
 Vern Terpstra
 Jacques Thomassen (born 1945) - Dutch organizational theorist 
 C. Bertrand Thompson
 Alvin Toffler
 Thomas Thorburn (1913–2003) - Swedish Professor of Business Administration
 Jean-Marie Toulouse
 Phil Town
 Henry R. Towne - scientific management (1890s)
 John Tregoning - factory management (1890s)
 Jack Trout
 Josiah Tucker
 Bruce Tuckman - stages of team development
 Dominique Turpin

U
 Yoichi Ueno
 Werner Ulrich
 Lyndall Urwick

V
 Peter Vaill
 Andrew H. Van de Ven
 Jan Vanthienen
 Hal Varian
 Antoaneta Vassileva
 Henrik Virkkunen (1917–1963) - Finnish organizational theorist and professor of accounting
 Henk Volberda
 Victor Vroom

W
 André de Waal
 Jean-Baptiste Waldner - computer-integrated manufacturing
 Alexandra Waluszewski (born 1956) - Swedish organizational theorist
 James Watt (1736–1819) - Industrial Revolution, division of labour, standard operating procedures, cost control (1810s)
 Max Weber - a founder of the modern study of sociology and public administration (1900)
 Frank E. Webner (1865–1940s) - American consulting cost accountant
 Karl E. Weick
 Lawrence Welch (born 1945) - Australian organisational theorist
 Joseph Wharton (1826–1909) - protective tariffs, business cycles, Wharton School of Business
 Alasdair A. K. White
 John Whitmore (c. 1870–1937) - American accountant, contributed to standard costing
 Eli Whitney (1765–1825) - interchangeable parts, cost accounting (1810s, 1820s)
 Jennifer Wilby
 Thomas Williams of Llanidan
 Oliver E. Williamson - transaction costs, theory of the firm (1960s)
 Mark W. Willis
 Pieter Winsemius
 Clinton Edgar Woods (1863–c. 1930) - factory organization (1900s)

Y
 Candace A. Yano

Z 
 Udo Zander (born 1959) - Swedish organizational theorist

See also
 List of economists

References

 List of business theorists
Business theorists